Some well known postmodern novels in chronological order:

Early postmodern novels

 A Universal History of Infamy (1935) by Jorge Luis Borges
 At Swim-Two-Birds (1939) by Flann O'Brien
 The Third Policeman (1940) by Flann O'Brien
 Ficciones (1941) by Jorge Luis Borges
 The Cannibal (1949) by John Hawkes
 The Aleph (1949) by Jorge Luis Borges

1950s

 Molloy (1951) by Samuel Beckett
 The Unnamable (1953) by Samuel Beckett
 The Recognitions (1955) by William Gaddis
 On the Road (1957) by Jack Kerouac
 Naked Lunch (1959) by William S. Burroughs
 The Tin Drum (1959) by Günter Grass

1960s

 The Sot-Weed Factor (1960) by John Barth
 Catch-22 (1961) by Joseph Heller
 Pale Fire (1962) by Vladimir Nabokov	
 Labyrinths (1962) by Jorge Luis Borges	
 A Clockwork Orange (1962) by Anthony Burgess
 The Man in the High Castle (1962) by Philip K. Dick
 Mother Night (1962) by Kurt Vonnegut
 Blow-up and Other Stories (1963) by Julio Cortázar
 V. (1963) by Thomas Pynchon
 Cat's Cradle (1963) by Kurt Vonnegut
 Hopscotch (1963) by Julio Cortázar	
 The Three Stigmata of Palmer Eldritch (1965) by Philip K. Dick
 Cosmicomics (1965) by Italo Calvino
 In Cold Blood (1966) by Truman Capote 
 The Crying of Lot 49 (1966) by Thomas Pynchon
 One Hundred Years of Solitude (1967) by Gabriel García Márquez
 Myra Breckenridge (1968) by Gore Vidal	
 The Universal Baseball Association, Inc., J. Henry Waugh, Prop. (1968) by Robert Coover
 Lost in the Funhouse (1968) by John Barth
 The Left Hand of Darkness (1969) by Ursula Le Guin
 Slaughterhouse-Five (1969) by Kurt Vonnegut
 The French Lieutenant's Woman (1969) by John Fowles	
 Ada or Ardor: A Family Chronicle (1969) by Vladimir Nabokov
 Ubik (1969) by Philip K. Dick

1970s

 Fear and Loathing in Las Vegas (1971) by Hunter S. Thompson
 G. (1972) by John Berger
 Invisible Cities (1972) by Italo Calvino
 Crash (1973) by J. G. Ballard
 Gravity's Rainbow (1973) by Thomas Pynchon
 Breakfast of Champions (1973) by Kurt Vonnegut
 Oreo (1974) by Fran Ross
 Flow My Tears, the Policeman Said (1974) by Philip K. Dick
 J R (1975) by William Gaddis
 The Autumn of the Patriarch (1975) by Gabriel García Márquez
 American Splendor (1976-2008) by Harvey Pekar
 A Scanner Darkly (1977) by Philip K. Dick
 If on a winter's night a traveler (1979) by Italo Calvino
 The Book of Laughter and Forgetting (1979) by Milan Kundera

1980s
		
 Midnight's Children (1981) by Salman Rushdie
 Valis (1981) by Philip K. Dick
 Sixty Stories (1981) by Donald Barthelme
 A Wild Sheep Chase (1982) by Haruki Murakami
 The Name of the Rose (1983) by Umberto Eco
 Shame (1983) by Salman Rushdie
 Money (1984) by Martin Amis
 The Unbearable Lightness of Being (1984) by Milan Kundera
 Neuromancer (1984) by William Gibson
 Nights at the Circus (1984) by Angela Carter
 Hard-Boiled Wonderland and the End of the World (1985) by Haruki Murakami
 Satantango (1985) by László Krasznahorkai	
 White Noise (1985) by Don DeLillo
 The Handmaid's Tale (1985) by Margaret Atwood
 The New York Trilogy (1985–86) by Paul Auster
 Red Sorghum (1986) by Mo Yan
 Maus (1986) by Art Spiegelman
 Foe (1986) by J. M. Coetzee
 Watchmen (1986–87) by Alan Moore and Dave Gibbons
 Beloved (1987) by Toni Morrison
 The Bonfire of the Vanities (1987) by Tom Wolfe
 Libra (1988) by Don Delillo
 Wittgenstein's Mistress (1988) by David Markson
 Foucault's Pendulum (1988) by Umberto Eco
 Dance Dance Dance (1988) by Haruki Murakami
 The Satanic Verses (1988) by Salman Rushdie

1990s

 The Black Book (1990) by Orhan Pamuk
 Vineland (1990) by Thomas Pynchon
 Soul Mountain (1990) by Gao Xingjian
 Haroun and the Sea of Stories (1990) by Salman Rushdie
 American Psycho (1991) by Bret Easton Ellis	
 Time's Arrow (1991) by Martin Amis
 The Gold Bug Variations (1991) by Richard Powers
 Mao II (1991) by Don Delillo
 Generation X: Tales for an Accelerated Culture (1991) by Douglas Coupland
 Leviathan (1992) by Paul Auster
 Snow Crash (1992) by Neal Stephenson
 Sarajevo Blues (1992) by Semezdin Mehmedinović
 The House of Doctor Dee (1993) by Peter Ackroyd
 The Island of the Day Before (1994) by Umberto Eco
 Galatea 2.2 (1995) by Richard Powers
 The Wind-Up Bird Chronicle (1995) by Haruki Murakami
 The Tunnel (1995) by William H. Gass	
 Blindness (1995) by José Saramago
 Infinite Jest (1996) by David Foster Wallace
 CivilWarLand in Bad Decline (1996) by George Saunders
 Primeval and Other Times (1996) by Olga Tokarczuk
 Underworld (1997) by Don DeLillo
 Mason & Dixon (1997) by Thomas Pynchon
 My Name Is Red (1998) by Orhan Pamuk
 The Savage Detectives (1998) by Roberto Bolaño
 Motherless Brooklyn (1999) by Jonathan Lethem
 The Ground Beneath Her Feet (1999) by Salman Rushdie
 The Intuitionist (1999) by Colson Whitehead
 Sputnik Sweetheart (1999) by Haruki Murakami

2000s

 White Teeth (2000) by Zadie Smith
 Pastoralia (2000) by George Saunders
 The Amazing Adventures of Kavalier & Clay (2000) by Michael Chabon
 A Heartbreaking Work of Staggering Genius (2000) by Dave Eggers
 House of Leaves (2000) by Mark Z. Danielewski
 The Cave (2000) by José Saramago
 Baudolino (2000) by Umberto Eco
 The Blind Assassin (2001) by Margaret Atwood
 number9dream (2001) by David Mitchell
 You Shall Know Our Velocity (2002) by Dave Eggers
 The Double (2002) by José Saramago
 Everything Is Illuminated (2002) by Jonathan Safran Foer
 Snow (2002) by Orhan Pamuk
 Kafka on the Shore (2002) by Haruki Murakami
 VAS: An Opera in Flatland (2002) by Steve Tomasula and Stephen Farrell
 The Curious Incident of the Dog in the Night-Time (2003) by Mark Haddon
 Elizabeth Costello (2003) by J. M. Coetzee
 2666 (2004) by Roberto Bolaño
 Cloud Atlas (2004) by David Mitchell
 The Mysterious Flame of Queen Loana (2004) by Umberto Eco
 Slow Man (2005) by J. M. Coetzee
 JPod (2006) by Douglas Coupland
 Life and Death Are Wearing Me Out (2006) by Mo Yan
 In Persuasion Nation (2006) by George Saunders
 Against the Day (2006) by Thomas Pynchon
 The Yiddish Policemen's Union (2007) by Michael Chabon
 Inherent Vice (2009) by Thomas Pynchon
 Generosity: An Enhancement (2009) by Richard Powers
 1Q84 (2009-2010) by Haruki Murakami

2010s

 Swamplandia! (2011) by Karen Russell
 A Visit from the Goon Squad (2011) by Jennifer Egan
 The Sense of an Ending (2011) by Julian Barnes
 The Angel Esmeralda (2011) by Don Delillo
 The Paper Menagerie (2011) by Ken Liu
 The Pale King (2011) by David Foster Wallace
 Ready Player One (2011) by Ernest Cline
 Bleeding Edge (2013) by Thomas Pynchon
 A Brief History of Seven Killings (2014) by Marlon James
 The Day the Sun Died (2015) by Yan Lianke
 The Familiar Volume 1, Volume 2, Volume 3, Volume 4, and Volume 5 (2015-2017) by Mark Z. Danielewski
 Swing Time (2016) by Zadie Smith
 The Underground Railroad (2016) by Colson Whitehead
 Moonglow (2016) by Michael Chabon
 4 3 2 1 (2017) by Paul Auster
 Killing Commendatore (2017) by Haruki Murakami
 The White Book (2017) by Han Kang
 Lincoln in the Bardo (2017) by George Saunders
 Quichotte (2019) by Salman Rushdie
 Black Leopard, Red Wolf (2019) by Marlon James

2020s
 Antkind (2020) by Charlie Kaufman
 Interior Chinatown (2020) by Charles Yu
 The Candy House (2022) by Jennifer Egan

See also
 List of postmodern critics
 List of postmodern writers
 Postmodern literature
 Postmodern art
 Postmodern film and television
 Graphic novel
 Criticism of postmodernism
 Pop culture fiction
 Literary fiction

References

External links
Postmodern Fiction in the New Millennium - The Reading Experience
Postmodernism and the Postmodern novel
Postmodern Novels and Novelists|Literary Theory and Criticism

20th-century novels
21st-century novels
Postmodern literature
 
1930s in literature
1940s in literature
1950s in literature
1960s in literature
1970s in literature
1980s in literature
1990s in literature
2000s in literature
2010s in literature
2020s in literature
Lists of novels